Viggo Johansen (born 19 August 1949) is a Norwegian television presenter.

He has been a newspaper journalist in Dagbladet and worked for TV 2, but is best known from the Norwegian Broadcasting Corporation.

He served as their correspondent in Brussels from 1993 to 1997, before he was appointed as magazine editor in 1998, news editor (among others of Dagsrevyen) in 1999 and finance editor in 2001. From 2002 to 2009 he presented his own programme, Redaksjon 1. He continued with his own Saturday night show, Viggo på lørdag.

In the 1960s and 1970s he played football for Vålerengen. His son Victor Johansen became a professional footballer.

References 

1949 births
Living people
Norwegian journalists
NRK people
Norwegian television reporters and correspondents
Norwegian footballers
Vålerenga Fotball players
Association footballers not categorized by position